The Romanian identity card is an official identity document issued to every Romanian citizen residing in Romania. It is compulsory to obtain the identity card from 14 years of age. Although Romanian citizens residing abroad are exempt from obtaining the identity card, if they intend to establish a temporary residence in Romania, they may then apply for a provisional identity document, which is valid for one year (renewable).

The identity cards are issued by the Directorate for Persons Record and Databases Management, subordinated to the Romanian Ministry of Administration and Interior.

History
The first identity documents were issued to Romanian citizens as a result of Decree No. 947 of 24.03.1921 which approved the Implementing Regulations of the Law nr.812 of 03.19.1915.

These documents were called bulletins registration office population and their contents match the information on your civil status, nickname, home address, occupation and semnalmentele holder (stature, hair, forehead, eyebrows, eyes, nose, mouth, chin, face, complexion special marks).

Although the regulation has established a pattern of ballot enrollment in public office, because they were made for each county, they were different in size, colour and sometimes even content.

Since 1949, which marked the establishment register in Romania, identity cards issued to Romanian citizens were printed uniquely throughout the country and called Identity bulletin.

These included fewer than the previous data about the holder, the holder's photograph and they apply is issued valid for 10 years. In time, identity card content has undergone some changes in that, since 1980 it could be entered two shelf life, by applying a second photo on the first closing date. In this way, Romanian citizen may be the same ID card holder for 20 years. At first, the identity card was made 8 file their number is reduced to 4 in 1990.

Law No.105 of 1996 on the population register and ID card, as amended and supplemented, created the legislative framework for a new ID i.e. identity card.

As a result, in June 1997 work began issuing the new format of identity card. The new identity document was designed and released into the computerised system is intended to facilitate a number of advantages for both the state and the citizen. The identity card is the document issued to Romanian citizen and proving identity, home address and, where appropriate, address of residence of the proprietor. This document is issued from the age of 14 years. The structures empowered to issue identity documents are public community services for People subordinated to local and county councils and the General Council of the municipality (and the local councils of Bucharest Municipality sectors). The old identity bulletins issued without expiry date to senior citizens remained valid (for use in Romania).

Information provided 
 Series and number of the ID card (changes every time the bearer changes the ID card)
 CNP the same for every ID card of the individual (see below)
 Surname(s)
 Given name(s)
 Sex
 Names of the parents (replaced with the nationality since 2009)
 Date of birth (not explicitly written on ID-2, but included in CNP)
 Address
 Issuing authority (mostly "SPCLEP <City>")
 Validity (issuing date (DD.MM.YY) and expiration date (DD.MM.YYYY))

Also it has two rows of optical readable information, like the passports.

Series of the ID card
The series of the ID card are formed of two letters, representing the abbreviation of the county (but not always) (the abbreviation is sometimes the same as the license plate indicative) or of the county's seat that issued the document.

CNP 
The card contains the individual's Cod Numeric Personal (CNP), or Personal Numeric  Code, a unique identifying number. The CNP is unique for each person which is used for taxation and other purposes

The CNP consist of 13 digits as follows:
 1 digit for the sex of the Person. 1=Male & 2=Female born before 1999, 3 & 4 before 1899, 5 & 6 before 2099, 7 & 8 for foreign residents
 6 digits for Date of birth YYMMDD
 2 digits represents the place of birth (County)
 next 3 digits is a number between 001 and 999. Each number is allocated only once per person per day
 last digit is a control digit calculated from all the other 12 digits in the code as follows: 
(n1*2+n2*7+n3*9+n4*1+n5*4+n6*6+n7*3+n8*5+n9*8+n10*2+n11*7+n12*9)%11 if the result is 10 then the digit is 1, otherwise is the result.

The CNP was established in 1978, through a decree signed by Nicolae Ceaușescu.

Future 
Since 2011, the Romanian Government tried implementing the more secure Electronic (Biometric) Identity Cards in line with the requirements of European Commission for general use, but the project fell short for a variety of reasons including privacy, religious freedom, cost and implementation strategy. In October 2019, the government rolled out an initiative for citizens to opt-in for an Electronic ID card with the aim of country-wide adoption by 2021. The first pilot programme was initiated in Cluj with the rest of the country to follow after. Cards from the non-electronic current model will continue to be valid until their designated expiry date.

Citizens who live abroad
Romanian citizens living abroad can apply for issuing first ID documents provided by law with diplomatic missions or consular offices in that State.
The identity card shall be issued as follows:
a) first identity card is issued to the age of 14;
b) for people aged 14–18 years the term of validity of the card is 4 years;
c) for people aged 18–25 years the term of validity of the card is 7 years;
d) the cards issued after the age of 25 years are valid for 10 years.
After age 55, the identity card is issued permanently valid (by making the validity date in excess of 40 years).

Travel 
The Identity card can be used instead of the Passport for travel in a number of countries, see list in the infobox.

Gallery

See also
 National identity cards in the European Union
 Romanian nationality law
 Romanian passport
 Visa policy of Romania
 Visa requirements for Romanian citizens

References

External links

 The National Inspectorate for Person's Identity
 The Border Police
Regulations on the electronic identity cards The Government of Romania

Government of Romania
National identity cards by country
Privacy in Romania